The Fish-Baughman House is a one-story, frame, California Ranch-style house at 3436 E. Ranch View Dr. in Millcreek, Utah.  It was built in 1955 and was listed on the National Register of Historic Places in 2016.

It was partly a pre-fabricated structure and was deemed significant "for its association with the architects Cliff May and Chris Choate, and the Cliff May Homes phenomenon of the mid-1950s."

The listing includes a second contributing building.

References

		
National Register of Historic Places in Salt Lake County, Utah
Colonial Revival architecture in Utah
Tudor Revival architecture in the United States
Houses completed in 1928
Buildings and structures in Millcreek, Utah